Anzegem is a municipality located in the Belgian province of West Flanders. The municipality comprises the towns of Anzegem proper, Gijzelbrechtegem, Ingooigem, Kaster, Tiegem and Vichte. On 1 January 2006 Anzegem had a total population of 14,609. The total area is 41.79 km² which gives a population density of 349 inhabitants per km².

One of the most famous inhabitants of Anzegem was Stijn Streuvels, the Flemish writer who died in Ingooigem in 1969, aged 98.

On the night of 16 October 2014, Anzegem's medieval parish church of Saint John the Baptist (Sint Jan de Doperkerk in Dutch) was destroyed in a fire.

References

External links

Official website  – Available only in Dutch

 
Municipalities of West Flanders